This article is about the list of Sport Libolo e Benfica basketball players. Benfica do Libolo is an Angolan basketball club from Kwanza Sul, Angola and plays their home games at Pavilhão Dreamspace in Luanda.  The club was established in 1942.

2011–2018
C.R.D. / S.L. Benfica Libolo basketball players 2011–2018

2009–2010
C.R.D. Libolo basketball players 2009–2010

External links
 Official website 
 Facebook profile
 Africabasket profile

References

C.R.D. Libolo basketball players